The Baton Rouge Tigers are a United States Australian Football League team, based in Baton Rouge, United States. It was founded in 2004. They play in the USAFL.

See also

References

External links
 

Australian rules football clubs in the United States
Tigers
Australian rules football clubs established in 2004
2004 establishments in Louisiana